Grigor Dimitrov won the title. He defeated Alexandre Kudryavtsev 6–4, 6–1 in the final.

Seeds

Draw

Finals

Top half

Bottom half

References
Main Draw
Qualifying Singles

Singles
Chang-Sat Bangkok Open - Singles
 in Thai tennis